Birds of Passage is an ambient, minimalist experimental music solo project of the New Zealand poet and singer-songwriter Alicia Merz based in Waikato. Birds of Passage was formed in 2010 and is used as a monicker for the artist. Birds of Passage is signed to Denovali Records and went on tour throughout Europe, after the release of the debut album Without the World.

Immediately after the 2011 Christchurch earthquake, she curated the release of a compilation called Tomorrow's Conversations with the participation of many other artists with proceeds donated to relief efforts for the earthquake victims.

Discography
Albums
2010: Garden of Secrets
2011: Without the World
2011: Dear and Unfamiliar (credited to Birds of Passage and Leonardo Rosado)
2012: Winter Lady
2014: This Kindly Slumber
2018: The Death of Our Invention
2021: The Last Garden
EPs
2011: I Was All You Are
2012: Highwaymen in Midnight Masks

References

External links
Denovali Records page

New Zealand musical groups
Denovali Records artists
Ambient music groups
Experimental musical groups
Musical groups established in 2010
2010 establishments in New Zealand